Taghcheh Jiq (also Romanized as Ţāghcheh Jīq; also known as Bāghcheh Jīq) is a village in Almalu Rural District, Nazarkahrizi District, Hashtrud County, East Azerbaijan Province, Iran. At the 2006 census, its population was 258, in 44 families.

References 

Towns and villages in Hashtrud County